Svenska dansbandsveckan is a dansband music festival in the Orrskogen folkpark of Malung, Sweden. It's held every Week 29. The event was first held in 1986. and is usually opened with the Guldklaven Awards being awarded.

In 2012 the event was visited by totally 50 700 people, which meant a new record had been broken.

References

External links
 official website 

1986 establishments in Sweden
Dalarna County
Dansband music
Music festivals in Sweden
Music festivals established in 1986